The Lincoln County R-III School District is a school district serving Hawk Point, Moscow Mills, and Troy in Missouri. Its headquarters are in Troy.

By 1993 a new automobile parts plant by Toyota opened in the district, so the district was gaining increased revenue.

Schools
 Troy Buchanan High School (Grades 10–12)
Troy Ninth Grade Center (Ninth Grade Only)
Troy Middle School
Troy South Middle School
Main Street Elementary School
Boone Elementary School
Claude Brown Elementary School
Cuivre Park Elementary
William Cappel Elementary School
Lincoln Elementary School
Lincoln County R-III Early Childhood Education Center
Hawk Point Elementary School

References

External links

 

School districts in Missouri
Education in Lincoln County, Missouri